The Ontario Medical Association (OMA) is a membership organization that represents the political, clinical and economic interests of Ontario physicians. Practising physicians, residents, and medical students enrolled in any of the six Ontario faculties of medicine are eligible for OMA membership. The OMA runs programs to encourage healthy living practices and illness prevention.

History
The OMA was founded in 1880 by physicians across the province of Ontario who encouraged the profession to unite and form a provincial medical association.

The Ontario Medical Association is governed by a Council and a Board of Directors. The Council comprises 270 physician delegates from districts across the province and sections of the profession, while the Board comprises physician representatives from eleven districts, one representative for Ontario’s six medical schools, and five directors elected by Council.

Membership and structure
The Ontario Medical Association (OMA) represents more than 34,000 physicians and medical students across the province. While membership is voluntary, as of 1991, all practicing physicians in Ontario are mandated by law to pay dues to the organization, regardless of whether or not they choose to be members. The Ministry of Health recognizes the organization as the sole negotiator on behalf of physicians in Ontario and has been called a union by Bob Rae, a claim rejected by the OMA.

Publications

Ontario Medical Review
The Ontario Medical Review (OMR), published 6 times a year, is the flagship publication of the OMA. The OMR acts as the primary means of dissemination and promotion regarding OMA programs, services and initiatives. The publication provides in-depth coverage of the issues and developments that affect the practice of medicine in Ontario, including legislative affairs, health policy, professional issues, health technology, business and finance, and practice management. The Review is distributed to all OMA Members, as well as to medical students and physicians outside the province who are members of the Ontario Medical Association.

Scrub-In Magazine
Scrub-In is the OMA’s award-winning medical student publication, and is the only provincial publication of its kind in Canada. Published three times a year (January, May and September), Scrub-In provides coverage of the issues and developments affecting approximately 4,000 medical students in Ontario. The magazine contains a wide array of student-generated content.

Foundation 
The OMA engages in fundraising and philanthropy through the Ontario Medical Foundation (OMF). Starting in 2018, the OMF began a transformation to dedicate more time and funds to charitable causes beyond its community of members. The OMF has received donations and sponsorships from over 7000 sponsors including individuals, corporations and societies. Some of the foundation's largest donors are Amgen, AstraZeneca, Bayer, the Canadian Medical Association, GlaxoSmithKline, KPMG, Merck Frosst, Pfizer Canada, Pharmacia, Royal Bank of Canada and Sun Life Financial.

Ontario Medical Schools
Queen's School of Medicine
University of Toronto Faculty of Medicine
Schulich School of Medicine & Dentistry
Northern Ontario School of Medicine
Michael G. DeGroote School of Medicine
Faculty of Medicine – University of Ottawa

See also
Canadian Medical Association
Professional Association of Internes and Residents of Ontario
College of Physicians and Surgeons of Ontario
Canadian Medical Association Journal

References

External links 
 

Medical associations based in Canada
Medical and health organizations based in Ontario
Professional associations based in Ontario
Organizations established in 1880
1880 establishments in Canada
1880 establishments in Ontario